Wyongah is a suburb of the Central Coast region of New South Wales, Australia. It is part of the Central Coast Council local government area.

Wyongah is mostly residential, although there is a small shopping area in the suburb. The area is close to Wyong Hospital and is serviced by Busways route 81, 82 and 83 buses. Routes 81 and 82 run from Lake Haven to Wyong and Tuggerah via Wyongah (and return) while the 83 is a local service from Lake Haven to Wyongah.

Notable people
 Bob Mirovic, boxer

References

Suburbs of the Central Coast (New South Wales)